Phacelia breweri is a species of phacelia known by the common name Brewer's phacelia.

Distribution
The plant is endemic to northern California, in and south of the San Francisco Bay Area. It is native to the Southern California Coast Ranges below , primarily in the Diablo Range and Gabilan Mountains . It is a member of the flora in chaparral and oak woodland habitats.

Description
 Phacelia breweri is a branching annual herb spreading or growing upright to a maximum height near 45 centimeters. It is glandular and coated in soft and coarse hairs. The lance-shaped or oval leaves are up to 4 centimeters long, the lower ones lobed.

The hairy inflorescence is a crowded, one-sided, curving or coiling cyme of many bell-shaped flowers. Each flower is about half a centimeter wide and light blue in color. The bloom period is March to June.

External links
Calflora Database: Phacelia breweri (Brewer's phacelia)
Jepson Manual eFlora (TJM2) treatment of Phacelia breweri
UC CalPhotos gallery of Phacelia breweri

breweri
Endemic flora of California
Natural history of the California chaparral and woodlands
Natural history of the California Coast Ranges
~
Gabilan Range
Endemic flora of the San Francisco Bay Area
Flora without expected TNC conservation status